Gloeophyllum trabeum is a species of fungus in the family Gloeophyllaceae.

References

Wood-decay fungi
Fungal plant pathogens and diseases
Fungi described in 1801
Gloeophyllales
Taxa named by Christiaan Hendrik Persoon